N is the fifth full-length studio album by Finnish melodic death metal band Norther. The album was released through Century Media Records on 13 February 2008 in Finland, and other dates in February for other parts of Europe. The track "Frozen Angel" from their previous EP, No Way Back, was re-recorded for the album. "We Rock" and "Frozen Angel" have been made into music videos. This is also the last Norther album to have founding member Petri Lindroos on vocal and guitar duties.

Track listing 
All songs written by Kristian Ranta, except where noted.

Credits

Band members 
 Petri Lindroos −  lead vocals, guitar
 Kristian Ranta − guitar, vocals (on 1,2,4,7,10,15)
 Heikki Saari − drums
 Jukka Koskinen − bass and Death growl
 Tuomas Planman − keyboards, programming

Production 
 Recorded and produced by Anssi Kippo at Astia Studios.
 Mixed by Fredrik Nordström at Studio Fredman in Sweden.

Release history

References 

2008 albums
Norther albums
Century Media Records albums